II is the second studio album (discounting their Christmas album) -  hence the title - by American R&B quartet Boyz II Men, released on August 30, 1994, on Motown Records. It contained the No. 1 singles "I'll Make Love to You" and "On Bended Knee", the latter of which replaced the former at the top of the Billboard Hot 100, making the group the third artist to replace themselves at No. 1 in the United States after Elvis Presley and The Beatles and the first to achieve the feat in 30 years.

"I'll Make Love to You" also spent 14 weeks at the top of the Hot 100 making them the first artist to achieve consecutive double digit runs at the top, with their prior single "End of the Road" topping the charts for 13 weeks and also equaled the record set by Whitney Houston's "I Will Always Love You" for the longest run at the top, a record which they held previously with "End of the Road". Other singles released achieved major success, including "Water Runs Dry", which reached No. 2, and "Thank You", which reached No. 21. "Vibin'", however, only reached No. 52.

The spoken track "Khalil (Interlude)" is a tribute to their road manager Khalil Rountree who was shot in Chicago, Illinois while the group was opening for MC Hammer's Too Legit to Quit tour. II became the inaugural winner of the Grammy Award for Best R&B Album, first presented at the 37th Grammy Awards in 1995.

According to producer Bob Robinson of the duo Tim & Bob, he and his partner Tim Kelley were asked by Boyz II Men to produce most of II. However, Motown Records then-president Jheryl Busby did not feel comfortable with the idea of two unknown producers dominating a second album from a group that was one of the biggest acts in the world at the time. As a result, Busby brought in Jimmy Jam and Terry Lewis and Babyface to deliver hit singles for the project. Busby insisted on "I'll Make Love to You" being the first single, despite objections from the group- who felt there were songs that could have been much stronger singles. The song became one of Boyz II Men's biggest hits.

Over 20 songs were recorded for II, but most of them never made the final track listing. Two of the songs Tim & Bob produced—"Now That We're Done" and "Can I Touch You"—ended up on 112's 1996 self-titled debut.

Reception

The album debuted at No. 1 in the Billboard 200 with 350,000 copies sold. It spent a total of five weeks at No. 1 and was the third best-selling album in 1995 in the United States and sold 12 million copies in the United States.

It did not make a huge impact in the United Kingdom, where it only made No. 17 on the UK Albums Chart. A Spanish language version, II: Yo Te Voy a Amar, was also issued. The album also won Best R&B Album at the 37th Grammy Awards. The album was ranked #495 on the September 22, 2020 edition of Rolling Stone's 500 Greatest Albums of All Time.

Track listing

Notes
"Thank You" contains a sample from "La-Di-Da-Di", performed by Doug E. Fresh, and written by Richard Walters and Douglas Davis.
"All Around the World" contains samples from "Kid Capri" by Daddy-O.
"U Know" contains a sample from "Don't Change Your Love", performed by The Five Stairsteps.
"Jezzebel" contains a sample of "Hootie Mack" by Bell Biv Devoe.

Charts

Weekly charts

Year-end charts

Decade-end charts

Certifications

Release history

See also
 List of best-selling albums in the United States
 List of number-one albums of 1994 (U.S.)
 List of number-one albums of 1995 (U.S.)
 List of number-one R&B albums of 1994 (U.S.)

References

1994 albums
Albums produced by Tim & Bob
Albums produced by Brian McKnight
Albums produced by Dallas Austin
Albums produced by Jimmy Jam and Terry Lewis
Boyz II Men albums
Motown albums
Grammy Award for Best R&B Album